The Croatian Figure Skating Championships are the figure skating national championship held annually to determine the national champions of Croatia. Skaters compete in the disciplines of men's singles, ladies' singles, pair skating, ice dancing, and synchronized skating, although not every discipline is held every year due to a lack of participants. The event is organized by Croatian Skating Federation, the sport's national governing body.

Medalists

Men

Women

Pairs

Ice dancing

Synchronized skating

Junior medalists

Men

Ladies

Pairs

Synchronized skating

References

External links
 Croatian Skating Federation 

 
Figure skating national championships
Figure skating in Croatia